Jonny Hovde  is a Norwegian handball player.

He made his debut on the Norwegian national team in 1955, 
and played 16 matches for the national team between 1955 and 1961. He participated at the 1958 World Men's Handball Championship.

References

Year of birth missing (living people)
Living people
Norwegian male handball players